Milano is an Italian surname that may refer to the following notable people:
Da Milano (disambiguation), multiple people
Alyssa Milano (born 1972), American actress and former singer
Anthony Milano (1888–1978), Italian American mobster
Archie Milano (1918–1991), American football player
Barbara Milano Keenan (born 1950), née Milano, Austrian-born American lawyer
Billy Milano (21st century), American heavy metal bass guitarist
Brett Milano (born 1957), American music critic and columnist
Carmen Milano (1929–2006), Italian American mobster
Dan Milano (born 1972), American voice actor and director
Dante Milano (1899–1991), Brazilian poet
Derrick Milano (born 1993), American songwriter, rapper, and singer
Ettore Milano (1925–2011), Italian racing cyclist
Fabio Milano (born 1977), Italian baseball player
Federico Milano, Irish engineer
Felice Milano (1891–1915), Italian football forward
Frank Milano, 21st century American judge of New York State and politician
Frank Milano (1891–1970), boss of the Cleveland crime family
Fred Milano (1939–2012), American doo-wop singer
Giuseppe Milano (1887–1971), Italian football midfielder and manager 
Gustavo Milano (born 1961), Argentine rugby union footballer, coach and sports agent
Jefferson Milano (born 1995), Venezuelan cyclist
Madonna Fitta de Milano, 17th-century Italian painter
Mario Milano (1935–2016), Australian professional wrestler
Mario Milano (archbishop) (born 1936), Italian Catholic bishop
Massimo Milano (born 1967), Italian music critic
Matt Milano (born 1994), American football player
Mauro Milano (born 1984), Argentine football player
Peter Milano (1925–2012), Italian American mobster
Ramona Milano (born 1969), Canadian actress
Sonny Milano (born 1996), American ice hockey player

Italian-language surnames